Parseierspitze is, at  tall, the highest mountain and the only three-thousander of the Northern Limestone Alps. It is the main peak of the Lechtal Alps, located in the Austrian state of Tyrol, northwest of Landeck.

Geography
The summit consists of radiolarite rocks preventing it from eroding. Due to its height, it is called the "Queen of the Lechtal Alps". The first documented attainment of the summit was made in 1869 by the Vienna entrepreneur Joseph Anton Specht (1828–1894) and his guide Peter Siess from Grins.

References

Mountains of Tyrol (state)
Mountains of the Alps
Alpine three-thousanders
Lechtal Alps